Kureh or Kowreh may refer to:
 Kowreh, Fars
 Kureh, Gilan
 Kureh, Kermanshah
 Kureh, Markazi
 Kureh-ye Olya, West Azerbaijan Province
 Kureh-ye Sofla, West Azerbaijan Province

See also
Kureh is a common element in Iranian place names; see 
 Koreh (disambiguation)